The 2011-12 Liga Nacional Superior de Voleibol Femenino is the 8th official season of the Peruvian Volleyball League, the second round started February 1, 2012 and will conclude March, 2012 and consists of a single Round-Robyn system where all 12 teams will play once against the other 11. The top 7 teams plus the best team from Round 1 (Géminis) will move on to the knockout stage.

Competing Teams

  Alianza Lima (ALI)
  Universidad César Vallejo (UCV)
  Circolo Sportivo Italiano (CSI)
  Deportivo Alianza (DAL)
  Géminis
  Divino Maestro (CDM)
 
  Latino Amisa (LAT)
  Regatas Lima (CRL)
  Universidad San Martín (USM)
  Sporting Cristal (SCR)
  Túpac Amaru (TUP)
  Wanka Surco (WKA)

Final standing procedure

 Match points
 Numbers of matches won
 Sets ratio
 Points ratio

Match won 3–0 or 3–1: 3 match points for the winner, 0 match points for the loser
Match won 3–2: 2 match points for the winner, 1 match point for the loser

Final standings

This ranking is a continuation of the First Round's Ranking.

Matches

|}

References

Volleyball competitions in Peru
2011 in Peruvian sport
2012 in Peruvian sport